KYYZ (96.1 FM) is a radio station licensed to Williston, North Dakota. It broadcasts a country music format. The station was first licensed as KLAN on April 1, 1980.

It also has two sister stations, KEYZ and KTHC. All three stations are owned by Townsquare Media, and are located at 410 6th Street East, on Williston's east side.

References

External links

YYZ
Williston, North Dakota
Radio stations established in 1980
1980 establishments in North Dakota
Townsquare Media radio stations